The 1991–92 Sporting de Gijón season was the 30th season of the club in La Liga, the 16th consecutive after its last promotion.

Overview
Real Sporting was eliminated in the round of 32 of the UEFA Cup. Previously, it eliminated Partizan after a penalty shoot-out in Istanbul.

Joaquín Alonso retired from football at the end of the season, after spending all his career at the club and playing 479 matches at La Liga, establishing a new record.

This was the last season of the club before its conversion into a Sociedad Anónima Deportiva.

Squad

Competitions

La Liga

Results by round

League table

Matches

UEFA Cup

Copa del Rey

Matches

Squad statistics

Appearances and goals

|}

Notes

References

External links
Profile at BDFutbol
Official website

Sporting de Gijón seasons
Sporting de Gijon